Thierry Ehrmann (born 1962) is the founder and current chairman of the Serveur Group,. He was born in Avignon. He works from his house which has been transformed into the artwork Abode of Chaos. He's on the far left of the political French spectrum. He is a freemason, and had founded his own lodge (Faits et Documents, n° 117, 2001, p. 1-2, 6).

Serveur Group & Artprice.com 
The Serveur Group manages databases of art auction quotations. The group has about 400 employees and annual revenue of about 70 million Euros. The information is administered from the ArtPrice website, which is the legal and auctions interface to the group.

Artprice.com compiles and updates art reference databases that cover art auction prices, artist biographies and artworks images from its library of 290,000 auction catalogues. It is listed on Eurolist by Euronext Paris (ARTF/PRC). Artprice has been accused of using spam marketing campaigns.

References

External links
French TV report France 2 Envoyé spécial, dailymotion.com
Terrorising the French countryside
NYT story July 19, 2006 It's his house. But village traditionalists ask is it Art?
France's abysmal Abode of Chaos CNN Travel
Apocalyptic art gallery angers French town
L'oeuvre au noir de Thierry Ehrmann
Interview on TV8 Mont Blanc by Gilles Meunier

1962 births
Living people
Businesspeople from Avignon
French businesspeople